Walter Thomas Maddox (born December 27, 1972) is an American politician who has served as the 36th mayor of Tuscaloosa, Alabama, since 2005. From 2001 to 2005, he served on the Tuscaloosa City Council and as executive director of personnel for Tuscaloosa City Schools. Maddox was a field director for the Alabama Education Association from 1996 to 2001.

Maddox was elected mayor of Tuscaloosa and has been reelected three times. In 2018, he was the Democratic nominee for governor of Alabama, losing to incumbent Republican Kay Ivey.

Early life and career
Maddox was born and raised in Tuscaloosa, attended the Tuscaloosa City Schools, and graduated from Central High School in 1991. He attended the University of Alabama at Birmingham, where he received a bachelor's degree in political science and a Master's in Public Administration.

From 1996 to 2001, Maddox served as a field director for the Alabama Education Association. In 2001, he was appointed executive director of personnel for Tuscaloosa City Schools, serving until he was elected mayor.  On August 28, 2001, Maddox was elected to the Tuscaloosa City Council, defeating incumbent Clell Hobson, 61% to 39%. He ran on a platform of education reform and crime reduction.

Mayor of Tuscaloosa
In 2005, longtime Tuscaloosa mayor Al DuPont retired. Maddox was an underdog against former city councilman Sammy Watson. Maddox came in second place in the initial round of voting, receiving 31.1% to Watson's 38%. This forced a runoff on September 13, which Maddox won with 54% of the vote to Watson's 46%. Maddox was inaugurated on October 3 in front of Tuscaloosa City Hall.

On August 25, 2009, Maddox was reelected without opposition.

Maddox was reelected again without opposition on August 27, 2013. On November 4, he was sworn in for his third term as mayor. Since his first inauguration, he has led initiatives to increase economic development, improve customer service with the implementation of Tuscaloosa 311 and provide quality pre-K education for academically at-risk four-year-olds.

For the first time since 2005, Maddox faced a challenger in the 2017 mayoral election. His opponent was the founder of the Urban Progressive Party, Stepfon Lewis. Maddox defeated Lewis with 89% of the vote to Lewis's 11%. He was sworn into his fourth term on May 22, 2017.

On March 2, 2021, Maddox was elected to his fifth term with 56% of the vote, defeating University of Alabama professor Serena Fortenberry and former University of Alabama football player Martin Houston.

2011 Tuscaloosa tornado

On April 27, 2011, a large EF4 tornado struck Tuscaloosa and Birmingham, killing 44 people in Tuscaloosa County and inflicting $927 million in damage to the city. The tornado, part of the 2011 Super Outbreak, was the second significant tornado to affect the city that month, as an EF3 tornado struck a similar part of the city on April 15. On April 29, Maddox toured the April 27 tornado damage with public officials including President Barack Obama and Governor Robert J. Bentley.

The tornado destroyed 12% of the city; it severely damaged or destroyed approximately 5,300 homes and businesses. Maddox was widely praised for his leadership in the aftermath of the storm. The Wall Street Journal described the Tuscaloosa disaster response as an attempt to "courageously create a showpiece" of "unique neighborhoods that are healthy, safe, accessible, connected, and sustainable."

Harvard Kennedy School crisis leadership fellow
Maddox is a fellow with the Program on Crisis Leadership at the Harvard University's Kennedy School of Government. He was promoted to senior fellow in the program in August 2019, and will partner with the Bloomberg Harvard City Leadership Initiative's executive education courses to discuss lessons he learned during Tuscaloosa's tornado recovery efforts.

2018 Alabama gubernatorial election

On October 5, 2017, Maddox announced his plans to run for governor of Alabama, saying Republican leadership had failed the state, which "still ranks near the bottom in every quality-of-life indicator from education to healthcare." He won the June 5 primary with 54.6% of the vote, defeating former Alabama Supreme Court Chief Justice Sue Bell Cobb. In November he lost to Republican incumbent governor Kay Ivey.

Maddox ran as a "pro-life," pro-Second Amendment candidate.

Endorsements
January 2, 2018: Lars Anderson writer and journalist 
April 19, 2018: The Crimson White
April 26, 2018: New South Coalition
April 30, 2018: Ron Sparks
May 16, 2018: West Alabama Labor Council
May 17, 2018: Birmingham Mayor Randall Woodfin
May 19, 2018: Alabama Democratic Conference
Mar 23, 2018: Roger Bedford

Personal life
On December 27, 1998, Maddox married Robin Maddox, a realtor. After having a daughter together, they divorced in 2008. On June 26, 2010, Maddox married Stephanie Nicole Roberts. Their son was born in 2013.

See also
 List of mayors of Tuscaloosa, Alabama

References

External links
Mayor of Tuscaloosa official government website
Walt Maddox for Mayor official campaign website

|-

1972 births
21st-century American politicians
Alabama city council members
Alabama Democrats
Methodists from Alabama
Living people
Mayors of places in Alabama
Politicians from Tuscaloosa, Alabama
University of Alabama at Birmingham alumni
UAB Blazers football players
Candidates in the 2018 United States elections